The Department of Revenue of the State of Tamil Nadu is one of the Department of Government of Tamil Nadu

History 
The department was formerly known as the Tamil Nadu Board of Revenue, an agency created under Company Rule and maintained under the Raj. It was renamed in 1980.

Former ministers                  
 O. Panneerselvam (2001-2006 , 2011-2017 and 2017-2021)

Objective & Functions of the Department 

1) Providing efficient delivery of services of various Government schemes to the people of Tamil Nadu.

2) Providing relief and implementing rehabilitation measures for those affected by Natural Calamities.

3) Functioning as the custodian of Government lands and ensuring proper maintenance of land records for the State.

4) Implementation of Land Reforms and providing land to the needy and eligible persons.

Sub - Departments

See also 
 Government of Tamil Nadu
 Tamil Nadu Government's Departments
 Ministry of Micro, Small and Medium Enterprises
 Department of Finance (Kerala)

References

External links 
 http://www.tn.gov.in/departments/rev.html (Official Website of the Tamil Nadu Revenue Department)
 http://www.tn.gov.in (Official website of Government of Tamil Nadu)
 http://www.tn.gov.in/rti/proact_revenue.htm (Tamil Nadu Revenue Department RTI)

Tamil Nadu state government departments
Economy of Tamil Nadu
1811 establishments in India
Government agencies established in 1811